Maurice Raoul-Duval (April 27, 1866 in Le Pecq – May 5, 1916 in Verdun) was a French polo player who competed in the 1900 Summer Olympics.

In 1900 he was part of the Bagatelle Polo Club de Paris team which won the bronze medal. He was also a member of the Compiègne Polo Club team which was eliminated in the first round of the same tournament.

He was killed in action during World War I.

See also
 List of Olympians killed in World War I

References

External links

Maurice Raoul-Duval – Olympic profile

1866 births
1916 deaths
French polo players
Olympic polo players of France
Polo players at the 1900 Summer Olympics
Olympic bronze medalists for France
French military personnel killed in World War I
Medalists at the 1900 Summer Olympics
Olympic medalists in polo
Sportspeople from Yvelines